Dorji Wangdi (born 15 August 1969) is a Bhutanese politician who has been the leader of the Bhutan Peace and Prosperity Party since 2020, and a member of the National Assembly of Bhutan, since 2008. He is currently the Opposition Leader of Bhutan after the resignation of Pema Gyamtsho from active politics.

Education
He received an Honours Bachelor of Commerce degree from Sherubtse College, Bhutan. He completed his Master of Business Administration from Maastricht School of Management, Netherlands.

Political career
Wangdi was elected for the first time to the National Assembly of Bhutan from Panbang constituency in 2008 Bhutanese National Assembly election on DPT seat and received 2,217 votes.

He was re-elected to the National Assembly of Bhutan as a candidate of DPT from Panbang constituency in the 2013 Bhutanese National Assembly election. He received 1,904 votes and defeated Tshering, a candidate of PDP and served as the Minister for Labour and Human Resources in Prime Minister Jigme Thinley's cabinet.

He was elected for the third time as a candidate of DPT to the National Assembly of Bhutan from Panbang constituency in 2018 Bhutanese National Assembly election. He received 2,984 votes and defeated Tshering, a candidate of DNT.

References

1969 births
Living people
Bhutanese MNAs 2018–2023
21st-century Bhutanese politicians
Druk Phuensum Tshogpa politicians
Bhutanese MNAs 2013–2018
Bhutanese MNAs 2008–2013
Sherubtse College alumni
Druk Phuensum Tshogpa MNAs